Kit Arthurine Raymond (21 May 1930 – 25 January 2009) was an Australian cricket player. Raymond played two test matches for the Australia national women's cricket team.

References

1930 births
2009 deaths
Australia women Test cricketers